The Ministry of Tourism, Arts and Culture  is a ministry of the Government of Malaysia that is responsible for tourism, culture, archives, library, museum, heritage, arts, theatre, handicraft, visual arts, convention, exhibitions, Islamic tourism and craft.

The Minister of Tourism, Arts and Culture administers his functions through the Ministry of Tourism, Arts and Culture and a range of other government agencies. In the Anwar Ibrahim cabinet, the ministry was renamed to Ministry of Tourism with the removal of arts and culture portfolios from the name.

Its headquarters is in Putrajaya.

See also
 Minister of Tourism (Malaysia)

References

External links
 
 

Federal ministries, departments and agencies of Malaysia
Malaysia
Malaysia
Tourism in Malaysia
Malaysian culture
Ministries established in 2013
2013 establishments in Malaysia